Boronia chartacea is a plant in the citrus family Rutaceae and is endemic to the north coast of New South Wales. It is a shrub with simple, papery leaves and bright pink flowers, usually arranged singly in the leaf axils.

Description
The leaves are covered with warty glands and the edges are turned downwards or rolled under. Flowering occurs from August to October and the fruit is a smooth capsule.

Taxonomy and naming
Boronia chartacea was first formally described in 1990 by Peter H. Weston and the description was published in Telopea from a specimen collected near Urunga. The specific epithet (chartacea) is a Latin word meaning "of paper", referring to the leaves that are papery and brittle when dried.

Distribution and habitat
This boronia grows in damp gullies and near creeks in disjunct populations near Wauchope, Urunga and Grafton.

References 

chartacea
Flora of New South Wales
Plants described in 1990